František Hrubín (17 September 1910 – 1 March 1971) was a Czech poet and writer.

Biography
Frantisek Hrubín was born into the family of a builder at Prague. His family lived in Lešany near Prague during World War I, and Hrubín visited his home village throughout his life. He studied at a grammar school in Prague. In 1932 he began studying law and philosophy at Charles University, but he did not graduate. In 1934 he started working as a librarian. He got married in 1939 and had a daughter and a son.  His children were a great impulse for writing children's poetry.

After World War II he worked briefly at the Ministry of Propaganda and became a freelance writer in 1946. He co-founded a legendary Czech children's magazine, Mateřídouška (The Thyme). He often stayed in Chlum u Třeboně (Jiří Trnka recommended he buy a cottage there) in South Bohemia, whose countryside  was an important source of inspiration for his work. In 1956 at the II. Czechoslovak Writers' Assembly he criticised (together with Jaroslav Seifert) criticized the combination of literature and politics which had increased after February 1948. In 1960 he became the chairman of the Poetry Friends Club (Klub přátel poezie). He died in České Budějovice and is buried at the Vyšehrad cemetery.

Works
 A co básník, 1963 
 Až do konce lásky, 1961 
 Až do konce poezie: Výbor z veršů, 1975 
 Básnické dílo Františka Hrubína, 1967–1977 (6 parts) 
 Běží ovce, běží, 1957 
 Buďme všichni básníky, 1966 
 Chléb s ocelí, 1945 
 Chvíli doma, chvíli venku, 1946 
 Cikády, 1943 
 Černá denice, 1968 
 Dětem, 1974 
 Dívej se a podívej, 1955 
 Dobrý den, sluníčko!, 1947 
 Doušek života, 1949 
 Drahokam domova, 1976 
 Dvakrát sedm pohádek, 1958 
 Dvě veselé pohádky (Pohádka o veliké řepě, 1957, Začarovaný les, 1957)
 Hirošima, 1948 
 Hodina zamilovaných, 1963 
 Hrajeme si celý den, 1955 
 Hrajte si s námi, 1953 
 Jak se chytá sluníčko, 1948 
 Je nám dobře na světě, 1951 
 Jobova noc, 1945 
 Knihy Františka Hrubína pro děti, 1968–1976 (3 parts) 
 Kolik je sluníček, 1961 
 Kráska a zvíře, 1972 
 Krásná po chudobě, 1935 
 Křišťálová noc, 1961 
 Kuřátko a obilí, 1953 
 Kůzlátka a hloupý vlk, 1992 
 Kytička z náčrtníku, 1958 
 Ladův veselý přírodopis, 1950 
 Lásky, 1967 
 Lešanské jesličky: Vánoční balada, 1970 
 Letadlo se skokany, 1968 
 Mánesův orloj, 1953 
 Mávnutí křídel, 1944 
 Měsíce, 1946 
 Modré hladiny: Výbor z díla, 1984 
 Modré nebe, 1948 
 Motýlí čas, 1948 
 Můj zpěv, 1956 
 Na paměť osvobození, 1960 
 Nesmírný krásný život, 1947 
 Nesu, nesu kvítí, 1951 
 Noční rozmluvy 
 Oblohy, 1960 
 Oldřich a Božena aneb Krvavé spiknutí v Čechách, 1969 
 Paleček, 1949 
 Pasáček a sluníčko, 1954 
 Po Novém roce jaro, 1959 
 Pohádka o Květušce a její zahrádce, plná zvířátek, ptáků, květin a nakonec dětí, 1955 
 Pohádka o tom, jak přišla kukačka o chocholku, 1961 
 Pohádky z Tisíce a jedné noci, 1956 
 Poledne, 1943 
 Poledne ženy, 1955 
 Proměna, 1957 
 Próza a dramata Františka Hrubína, 1969 
 Přilby a šeříky, 1960 
 Romance pro křídlovku (Romanze für ein Flügelhorn), 1962 
 Řeka nezapomnění, 1946 
 Říkejte si abecedu, 1948 
 Říkejte si pohádky, 1946 
 Říkejte si se mnou, 1943 
 S orly a se skřivany, 1943 
 Sněhurka, zvířátka a sedm mužíčků, 1948 
 Srpnová neděle, 1958 
 Svit hvězdy umřelé: Za Františkem Halasem, 1967 
 Sviť, sluníčko, sviť, 1961 
 Šípková Růženka, 1951 
 Školáčkův rok, 1956 
 Špalíček pohádek (Ein Bündel Märchen), 1957 
 Špalíček veršů a pohádek, 1960 
 Ticho: Památce Františka Halase, 1950 
 To je jízda, to je let!, 1950 
 Tři kluci sportovci, 1950 
 U srdce Tvého 
 U stolu, 1958 
 Vánoční sen malé Zdeny v noci štědrovečerní, 1947 
 Včelí plást, 1940 
 Verše 1942-1948, 1956 
 Vidím zemi širou, 1968 
 Vítek hádá dobře, 1946 
 Výbor z poezie 1932-1938, 1947 
 Za hvězdné noci, 1981 
 Zasadil dědek řepu, 1947 
 Země po polednách, 1937 
 Země sudička, 1941 
 Zimní pohádka o Smolíčkovi, 1954 
 Zlatá reneta, 1964 
 Zpěv hrobů a slunce, 1947 
 Zpíváno z dálky, 1933 
 Zvířátka a Petrovští, 1947 
 Živá abeceda, 1954 
 Živote, postůj: Výbor z díla, 1987

External links
 Biography  

20th-century Czech poets
Czech male poets
1910 births
1971 deaths
Writers from Prague
Czechoslovak communists
Czechoslovak writers
20th-century Czech dramatists and playwrights
Czech male dramatists and playwrights
Burials at Vyšehrad Cemetery
Charles University alumni